Black Mask, Black Gloves is the second solo studio album by American rapper Hell Rell. It was released on July 22, 2008 via Babygrande Records. Production was handled by AraabMuzik, Kajmir Royale, Hassiditty, GoodWill & MGI, Manti, and Hell Rell himself. It features guest appearances from J.R. Writer and Sen City. The album debuted at number 131 on the Billboard 200, selling 5,390 copies in its first week. The first single released from the album was "Get Ready".

Track listing

Personnel
Durrell "Hell Rell" Mohammed – vocals, producer (track 9), executive producer
Seneca "Sen City" Lockwood – vocals (track 8)
Rusty "J.R. Writer" Brito – vocals (track 9)
Abraham "AraabMuzik" Orellana – producer (tracks: 1, 2, 4, 11)
Derrick "Manti" Ridley – producer (track 3)
Hassiditty Harper – producer (tracks: 5, 9), executive producer, A&R
Henri "MGI" Lanz – producer (tracks: 6, 10)
Abraham "Kajmir Royale" Gaskin – producer (tracks: 7, 8, 12)
Saga Legin – recording, mixing
Mark B. Christensen – mastering
Chuck Wilson – executive producer
Miami Kaos – artwork, design
Ben Dotson – product management
Willy Friedman – product management
Jesse Stone – product management, marketing
George "DukeDaGod" Moore – promotion

Charts

References

External links

2008 albums
Hell Rell albums
Babygrande Records albums
Albums produced by AraabMuzik